Eamon McEneaney is an Irish former Gaelic footballer and manager. As a player, he won the National Football League in 1985. He most recently managed the senior Monaghan county team.

Playing career
As a player with Monaghan, McEneaney won three Ulster Football titles in 1979, 1985 and in 1988. He also won an U-21 title as a player in 1981 and as manager of Monaghan U-21's in 1999. He won 2 Ulster club titles in 1986 and 1991 as Captain with his club Castleblayney Faughs.

Coaching career
McEneaney had previously managed Monaghan in a joint capacity with former GAA president Seán McCague in 1997 and then on his own in 1998 and 1999, winning an All-Ireland B Championship in 1998. He subsequently had a spell in charge of Louth from 2006 to 2009, where he guided them to a Division 2 league title, an O'Byrne Cup success in 2009 and a first Leinster Junior title since 1966.

McEneaney took over as manager of the Monaghan senior inter-county team in October 2010 from Seamus McEnaney who confirmed that he would not allow his name go forward for the role which he had held for the previous six years. The Monaghan County Board decided in August 2010 that McEnaney would be forced to go through the nomination process after a poor finish to the 2010 All-Ireland Championship.

In July 2012, McEneaney left the Monaghan job after an All-Ireland Senior Football Championship qualifier defeat to Laois. He said:

Playing honours
Intercounty
 3 Ulster Senior Football Championships (1979, 1985, 1988)
 3 Dr. McKenna Cups (1979,1980, 1983)
 1 National Football League (1985)
 1 Ulster Under-21 Football Championship (1981) [c]

Club
 8 Monaghan Senior Football Championships (1976, 1982, 1986, 1988, 1990, 1991, 1995, 1996)
 2 Ulster Senior Club Football Championships (1986, 1991)
 3 Monaghan Senior Football League Division 1s (1994, 1995, 1996)

Coaching honours
Manager 
 1 All-Ireland Senior Football B Championship (1998)
 1 Tommy Murphy Cup (2006)
.1U21 Ulster championship (1999)
 1 National Football League Division 2 (2006)
 1 O'Byrne Cup (2009)
 1 Leinster Junior Football Championship (2009)
Leinster Intermediate club championship [Geraldines GFC  2013]

References

 

Year of birth missing (living people)
Living people
Gaelic football managers
Monaghan inter-county Gaelic footballers
Ulster inter-provincial Gaelic footballers